TPAP can mean any of the following:

 Tetrapropylammonium perruthenate
 Trivial Pursuit: America Plays